German submarine U-284 was a Type VIIC U-boat of Nazi Germany's Kriegsmarine during World War II.

The submarine was laid down on 1 July 1942 at the Bremer Vulkan yard at Bremen-Vegesack as yard number 49. She was launched on 6 March 1943 and commissioned on 14 April under the command of Oberleutnant zur See Günter Scholz.

Design
German Type VIIC submarines were preceded by the shorter Type VIIB submarines. U-284 had a displacement of  when at the surface and  while submerged. She had two shafts and two  propellers.

U-284 was fitted with five  torpedo tubes (four fitted at the bow and one at the stern), fourteen torpedoes, one  SK C/35 naval gun, 220 rounds, and two twin  C/30 anti-aircraft guns. The boat had a complement of between forty-four and sixty.

Service history
U-284 served with the 8th U-boat Flotilla for training from April to October 1943 and operationally with the 9th flotilla from 1 November. She carried out one patrol, sinking no ships. She was a member of one wolfpack.

Patrol
The boat's only patrol began with her departure from Kiel on 23 November 1943. She passed between Iceland and the Faroe Islands and into the Atlantic Ocean. She was scuttled southeast of Greenland on 21 December 1943, after sustaining sea damage.

References

Bibliography

External links

German Type VIIC submarines
U-boats commissioned in 1943
U-boats sunk in 1943
World War II submarines of Germany
World War II shipwrecks in the Atlantic Ocean
1943 ships
Ships built in Bremen (state)
Maritime incidents in November 1943